The France men's national 3x3 team is the 3x3 basketball team representing France in international men's competitions, organized and run by the Fédération Française de Basket-Ball.

Senior Competitions

FIBA 3x3 World Cup

FIBA 3x3 Europe Cup

Mediterranean Games
Winner: 2022

See also

 Fédération Française de Basket-Ball
 France national basketball team
 France women's national 3x3 team
 France mixed national 3x3 team

References

External links

3
Men's national 3x3 basketball teams